Kenesei is a Hungarian surname. Notable people with the surname include:

István Kenesei (born 1947), Hungarian linguist
Krisztián Kenesei (born 1977), Hungarian footballer
Zoltán Kenesei (born 1972), Hungarian footballer

Hungarian-language surnames